Master Swordsman Lu Xiaofeng 2 is a television series adapted from Gu Long's Lu Xiaofeng novel series. The series is a sequel to Master Swordsman Lu Xiaofeng and was first broadcast in June 2001.

Cast
 Eric Suen as Lu Xiaofeng
 Gigi Lai as Han Ling
 Christopher Lee as Ximen Chuixue
 Rayson Tan as Hua Manlou
 Ma Yong as Sikong Zhaixing
 Yvonne Lim as Ye Xue
 Mark Cheng as Ye Guhong / Laodao Bazi
 Yu Rongguang as Gong Jiu
 Stephanie Lim as Sha Man
 Gong Xiaoxuan as Niuroutang
 Zhang Peihua as Master Kugua
 Fang Jiwei as Sun Xiuqing
 Hu Shida as Yue Yang
 Jerry Chang as Duan Yi

Nominations

External links

2001 Singaporean television series debuts
2001 Singaporean television series endings
Works based on Lu Xiaofeng (novel series)
Singaporean wuxia television series
Chinese wuxia television series
Taiwanese wuxia television series
Singaporean television co-productions
Television shows based on works by Gu Long
Channel 8 (Singapore) original programming